Jim Harrison (January 12, 1936 – June 18, 2016) was an American artist and writer whose work is known for chronicling earlier twentieth century rural life. Harrison's paintings are featured in personal and corporate art collections across the United States, and he had successful one-man shows at the Hammer Galleries in New York City and the Conacher Gallery in San Francisco.

Biography
Jim Harrison was born in his grandmother's house in Leslie, Georgia, on January 12, 1936.  When he was six years old, his father took a job with American Telephone and Telegraph Company, and his mother worked as a Southern Bell switchboard operator in Denmark, South Carolina. At Denmark High School Harrison worked on the annual staff, school newspaper, and class bulletin boards.  During summer vacations, Harrison took a job as an assistant to a seventy-year-old sign painter, J. J. Cornforth. The elderly gentleman taught him how to letter, and for several summers the two traveled the rural areas around Denmark painting Coca-Cola bulletins on the sides of barns and country stores. Harrison marks this time as what sparked his interest in art.  His mother also pushed him to pursue his interests in art.  After high school graduation Harrison entered the University of South Carolina where he pursued a dual major in art and physical education.  In 1960 he began an eleven-year high school coaching career which included working for the American League baseball team the Cleveland Indians as a part-time talent scout from 1965 through 1970.  At three schools he coached football, girls' basketball, and baseball, and he never experienced a losing season as a head coach.  In 1970 he declined an offer to join the Furman University football coaching staff and returned to his hometown of Denmark, South Carolina to pursue a career as an artist.

In 1972, Harrison had no knowledge of the art market, but went to New York City for the fall Greenwich Village sidewalk art show.  His only sale during the three-week show was an $85 original, and it cost him $800 in expenses. After several years he had 10 galleries selling his originals.  He published his first limited edition print, "Coastal Dunes" in 1973 through Frame House Gallery of Louisville, Kentucky.  In 1975, Frame House released their first Jim Harrison print, "Rural Americana" through the publisher's network of 600 dealers. Many of his prints have appreciated up to 3,000 percent of their original value.

Harrison's paintings are featured in personal and corporate art collections across the country including The Coca-Cola Company in Atlanta, Georgia; The Maytag Corporation in Newton, Iowa; Philip Morris Company in New York, New York; The Leo Burnett Company in Chicago, Illinois; and the Augusta National Golf Club in Augusta, Georgia.

He was a licensee of The Coca-Cola Company for more than 10 years and produces The Coca-Cola Calendar for collectors each year. He first painted the company's trademark on the side of an old barn as the 14-year-old apprentice of the elderly sign painter, J. J. Cornforth.  Currently, Harrison's artwork can be found in his studio located in Denmark, South Carolina, where he first realized his love for the arts. His later paintings depict the rural life of the 20th-century Americans including images of churches, bridges, and buildings.

In addition to his artwork, Harrison is the author or illustrator of several books including:
Pathway to a Southern Coast, Country Stores, American Christmas, The Passing: Perspective of Rural America, Jim Harrison Cookbook: Southern Cooking and Southern Stories, and Jim Harrison, His World Remembered. He is currently working on a book on the Palmetto Tree for the USC Press due to be released in 2012. Jim Harrison was found dead in his office after suffering from a heart attack on June 18, 2016.

Awards and honors 
Harrison was named by the Governor of Kentucky to the Honorable Order of Kentucky Colonels, having the park in Denmark named in his honor, and being named a Distinguished Adjunct Professor at the University of South Carolina Aiken. He has served on the boards of South Carolina National Bank and Security Federal Bank, on the board of Vorhees College and Denmark Technical College, and on the board of the Denmark Downtown Development Association. Also, being a strong advocate for the mentally ill, he served on the board of the governor's legislative council for mental health and mental retardation.

In 2008, he was honored by former South Carolina governor Mark Sanford with the Order of the Palmetto Award for his service as a citizen of the state. Also in June 2008, he was honored for his contributions to art and the State of South Carolina by the South Carolina House of Representatives. Citing Harrison as a "nationally and internationally acclaimed artist" and as "one of the Palmetto State's Chief Art Treasures", the resolution congratulated Harrison on his more than 38 years as a successful artist and on the occasion of his 20th anniversary of Jim Harrison Gallery in Denmark, SC. In May 2010, Harrison was awarded an Honorary Doctorate of Fine Arts by University of South Carolina president Dr. Harris Pastides. The honor was bestowed for his work as a professional artist, the prestige he had brought to the University and the State, and his contributions to charitable organizations.

Notes

Bibliography 
 American Christmas (1994) Longstreet Press, Inc., Atlanta, Georgia, Written and Illustrated by Jim Harrison
 Country Stores (1993) Longstreet Press, Inc., Atlanta, Georgia, Written and Illustrated by Jim Harrison
 Jim Harrison Cookbook: Southern Cooking & Southern Stories" (2011) Sun Printing, Orangeburg, South Carolina, Written and Illustrated by Jim Harrison
 Jim Harrison, His World Remembered (1982) American Masters Foundation, Houston, Texas, Written by Gary C. Dickey, Illustrated by Jim Harrison
 The Passing: Perspectives of Rural America (1988) Longstreet Press, Inc., Atlanta, Georgia, Written by Ferrol Sams, Illustrated by Jim Harrison
 Pathways to a Southern Coast (Reprinted 2009) University of South Carolina Press, Columbia, South Carolina, Written by Jerry Blackwelder, Illustrated by Jim Harrison

References 
 Jim Harrison Website biography 
 Order of Palmetto Award 
 Glimpses of Aiken article 
 USC Press 
 USC Honorary Degree article 
 SC House of Representatives Resolution, April 8, 2008

External links
 Jim Harrison website 
 South Carolina ETV interview 
 South Carolina State Museum Traveling Jim Harrison Exhibit 
 Sandlapper article 
 South Carolina Arts Commission 
 "50 Years with Coca-Cola", Sandlapper article 

1936 births
2016 deaths
20th-century American painters
American non-fiction writers
American illustrators
People from Sumter County, Georgia
Artists from Georgia (U.S. state)
Writers from Georgia (U.S. state)
21st-century American painters